This Is My Heart is the first full-length studio album released in 2008 by alternative metal band Since October. It is the first full-length to be released on Tooth & Nail Records.  They have released a music video for their songs: "Disaster" and "Guilty." Guilty reached number 21 on the U.S. Mainstream Rock chart. "Disaster" placed on the X 2009 Christian Rock Hits compilation as a bonus track.

Track listing

Members
Ben Graham – lead vocals
Luke Graham – guitar, backing vocals
Josh Johnson – bass, backing vocals
Audie Grantham – drums, screaming vocals

References

2008 albums
Since October albums
Tooth & Nail Records albums